Silvia Hindorff (later Hafemeister), born 27 June 1961 in Sebnitz, German Democratic Republic (the former East Germany) is a German former gymnast who competed at the 1978 and 1979 World Gymnastics Championships and the 1980 Summer Olympics. She is the 1980 East German National bronze medalist on floor exercise.

Eponymous skill 
Hindorff invented a release move on the uneven bars (free hip to straddle reverse Hecht) that bears her name in the Code of Points.

References

1961 births
Living people
German female artistic gymnasts
Olympic gymnasts of East Germany
Gymnasts at the 1980 Summer Olympics
Olympic bronze medalists for East Germany
Olympic medalists in gymnastics
Medalists at the 1980 Summer Olympics
Originators of elements in artistic gymnastics
20th-century German women
21st-century German women